BAP Capitán Quiñones (CL-83) was a  in service with the Peruvian Navy. Renamed BAP Almirante Grau (CL-81), in honor of the Peruvian Admiral Miguel Grau, it arrived to its new homeport of Callao on 31 January 1960.

As fleet flagship, the ship participated in several exercises, including the multinational UNITAS manoeuvres. In 1963, after the creation of the Servicio de Aviación Naval (Naval Aviation Service), Almirante Grau started operating Bell 47G helicopters from its fantail. As such it was passed to a reserve status on 6 March 1980 and decommissioned on 2 May of the same year.

Sources
Rodríguez Asti, John, Cruceros. Buques de la Marina de Guerra del Perú desde 1884. Dirección de Intereses Marítimos, 2000.

Crown Colony-class cruisers of the Peruvian Navy
Ships built on the River Tyne
1941 ships